Bolsón Cove is a cove at the head of Flandres Bay, lying immediately east of Etienne Fjord, along the west coast of Graham Land. It was first charted by the Belgian Antarctic Expedition under Gerlache, 1897–99. The name appears on an Argentine government chart of 1954 and is probably descriptive; "bolsón" is Spanish for a large purse.

References
 

Coves of Graham Land
Danco Coast